Pearson Fuels is a privately held alternative fuel retailer founded in San Diego in 2003. Pearson Fuels is notable as the first alternative fuel station in the United States to offer alternate vehicle fuels including ethanol, biodiesel, compressed natural gas (CNG), propane, hydrogen, and electric vehicle charging. Pearson Fuels is headquartered in San Diego.

History 
Pearson Fuels was founded in 2002 by three business associates that owned and managed one of San Diego’s car dealerships, Pearson Ford. Their first project was a retail fuel station located on El Cajon Blvd. in San Diego. The station opened in 2003 as the nation’s first alternative fuel station. Specializing in bringing alternative fuels to the public, the station brought the first E85 station to the State of California, the first Biodiesel station to San Diego and the county’s first dual pressure natural gas station. The station is now called Pearson Fuel Depot.

Over the next 15 years, Pearson Fuels expanded a new business model throughout the State of California. With funding from the California Air Resource Board, the California Energy Commission (CEC) and the US Department of Energy, Pearson Fuels worked with retail gasoline fuel station owners to assist in entering the alternative fueling business. Based on the number of delivery locations, Pearson has become the largest distributor of E85 in the State of California.

In 2014, Pearson Fuels entered the hydrogen market and signed up its first retail hydrogen refueling location. Pearson is also a supplier of Bulk Ethanol to the traditional fuel industry.

In February 2022 Pearson Fuels announced the opening of its 250th retail E85 flex fuel station, which is located in Salinas, CA.

Grants 
In 2010, the company received $1.8 million state grant, in order to assist put biodiesel into more tanker trucks.

In 2014, Pearson received $1.35 million grant from the California Energy Commission to expand the company’s flex fueling network. With support from the CEC, Pearson Fuels developed two existing diesel terminals into biodiesel blending terminals, which allows fuel truck operators to load various blends of biodiesel and regular diesel simultaneously. This ultimately eliminates the truck from making trips to two different racks and more importantly, breaks down additional barriers of alternative fuels use.

Products
Pearson offers 10 different kinds of fuel today, ranging from gasoline to ethanol.

See also 

 Biofuel
 BioEthanol for Sustainable Transport
 E85
 Charging station
 Ethanol fuel
 Flexible-fuel vehicle
 Natural gas vehicle
 Biodiesel in the United States
 BioFuels Security Act
 California Energy Commission

References

Biofuel in the United States
Energy in California
Companies based in San Diego
Energy companies established in 2003
Renewable resource companies established in 2003
American companies established in 2003
2003 establishments in California